Gregory Pason (born April 19, 1966) is an American political candidate, activist, and National Secretary of the Socialist Party USA, a position he has held for over 20 years. Additionally, Pason has served in various positions in the Socialist Party of New Jersey and Northern New Jersey Socialist Party, currently serving as treasurer of the former and chair of the latter.

Career 
Pason joined the Party in 1989, shortly after joining the Party's official youth arm, the Young People's Socialist League (YPSL).

As the National Secretary, Pason runs the day-to-day business of the Party, out of the national office in New York City.

He has run for several public offices in the past two decades, including two campaigns for Governor of New Jersey and four campaigns for the United States Senate. He has achieved ballot status for all seven of his campaigns, a rarity for perennial candidates.

Campaign history
2012 US Senate election: 2,249 votes (0.07%) 
2009 Gubernatorial election: 2,085 votes (0.09%)
2006 US Senate election: 2,490 votes (0.1%)
2002 US Senate election: 2,702 votes (0.13%)
2000 US Senate election: 3,365 votes (0.11%)
1997 Gubernatorial election: 2,800 votes (0.12%)
1994, District 9 Congressional election: 1,490 votes (0.93%)

References

External links

SPUSA Official Website
SPNJ Official Website
Socialist Party of Northern New Jersey

1966 births
Socialist Party USA politicians from New Jersey
Living people
People from Kearny, New Jersey